Il ballo della vita is the debut studio album by Italian rock band Måneskin. It was released on 26 October 2018. The album peaked at number one on the Italian Albums Chart, managed to reach Top 20 on European music charts, and received a triple platinum certification by FIMI. The album includes the hit singles "Morirò da re", "Torna a casa", "Fear for Nobody", "L'altra dimensione" and "Le parole lontane".

Description
Like in the previous EP Chosen, Il ballo della vita is a modern Italian pop rock record with influences from funk, reggae and ska. In an The Upcoming interview, the band cited Led Zeppelin, Arctic Monkeys, Harry Styles, Red Hot Chili Peppers and Bruno Mars as inspirations for the album.

The album's title is meaning a "celebration of youth, of freedom". The central figure of the album's lyrics is the fictional muse "Marlena", a "woman who represents beauty and the message we want to communicate: a message of freedom of choice, of attitude, of style to which we have tried to give a face, a name and a voice". Another protagonist is a man who wants to be with her until the very end. According to Damiano David, she is also a "personification of the fear of not being able to be oneself. Man is security, believing in oneself, like a father or an older brother, and he takes this woman into an objectively uncomfortable situation to bring her to a better version: not changing her, but making her accept herself, her aspirations".

Five out of twelve songs in the album contain lyrics in English: "New Song", "Sh*t Blvd", single "Fear for Nobody", "Are You Ready?" and "Close to the Top".

Promotion
In October 2018, the band released This Is Måneskin, a documentary film which delved into the band's career beginnings, personal life and the creative process of producing the album.

The album was promoted by their first career tour which was held between 2018 and 2019, and which had sold-out over 70 dates with more than 140,000 tickets, including their first European tour with eleven sold-out dates in Spain, France, Switzerland, Germany, Belgium and the United Kingdom.

Commercial performance
By May 2019, the tracks accumulated more than 196 million streams on Spotify. Following the band's win at the Eurovision Song Contest 2021 with the song "Zitti e buoni" (from their succeeding album Teatro d'ira: Vol. I), the album entered charts outside Italy (and Switzerland) for the first time.

Track listing
All tracks are written by Damiano David, with track #7 co-written by Matteo Privitera and composed by Luigi Florio.

Personnel 
Credits are adapted from the album's liner notes.
Group
 Damiano David – vocals, arrangement
 Victoria De Angelis – bass guitar, arrangement
 Thomas Raggi – electric guitar, acoustic guitar, resonator guitar, arrangement 
 Ethan Torchio – drums, percussion, drum machine, arrangement 

Additional musicians
 Fabrizio Ferraguzzo – arrangement, orchestration, synth, synthesizer (Juno), drum machine, lap steel guitar
 Enrico Brun – orchestration, synth, electric organ (Organo Hammond), synthesizer (Moog), mellotron, synthesizer (Juno), fortepiano, keyboards (Solina, Farfisa)
 Riccardo Jeeba Gibertini – trumpet, flugelhorn, trombone
 Marco Zaghi – tenor saxophone, baritone saxophone, flute
 Andrea Di Cesare – violin, viola
 Mattia Boschi – violoncello

Production and design
 Måneskin – production
 Fabrizio Ferraguzzo – production, engineering, mastering
 Riccardo Damian – recording
 Enrico La Falce – engineering, mastering
 Corrado Grilli - graphic design
 Paolo Sant'Ambrogio - photography

Charts

Weekly charts

Year-end charts

Certifications

References

2018 debut albums
Måneskin albums